Edward Ridley Finch (November 15, 1873 – September 16, 1965) was an American lawyer and politician.

Early life
His father was Edward Lucius and his mother was Anne Crane (née Ridley). He was a descendant of Abraham Finch, a native of England, who came to America with John Withrop's company in 1630 and settled in Massachusetts.

He graduated from Yale College in 1895, and from Columbia University School of Law in 1898.

Political career
He was a Republican member of the New York State Assembly (New York Co., 5th D.) in 1902, 1903 and 1904. In 1911 he helped found The New York Young Republican Club.

Lawyer
On August 20, 1915, he was appointed by Governor Charles S. Whitman a justice of the New York Supreme Court to fill the vacancy caused by the death of Justice Delany, and was re-elected in 1915 and 1929. From 1922 on, he sat on the Appellate Division, First Dept., and in April 1931 was appointed Presiding Judge.

In 1934, he ran on the Democratic ticket for the New York Court of Appeals, and was elected to a fourteen-year term, but resigned on April 30, 1943, to resume his private law practice. Thomas D. Thacher was appointed to fill the vacancy temporarily.

Family
Finch's grandson and namesake, Edward Finch Cox, is the son-in-law of former President Richard Nixon and former First Lady Pat Nixon and current chairman of the New York Republican State Committee.

References

The History of the New York Court of Appeals, 1932-2003 by Bernard S. Meyer, Burton C. Agata & Seth H. Agata (page 20)
 Court of Appeals judges
JUSTICE FINCH in NYT on August 21, 1915
E. R. FINCH SWORN IN in NYT on August 22, 1915
JUDGE E.R. FINCH PLANS TO RESIGN in NYT on February 28, 1943 (subscription required)
APPOINTS THACHER TO APPEALS BENCH in NYT on May 13, 1943 (subscription required)
Edward Ridley Finch, 91, Dies in NYT on September 16, 1965 (subscription required)

Judges of the New York Court of Appeals
1873 births
1965 deaths
American people of English descent
Yale College alumni
Columbia Law School alumni
New York (state) Republicans
New York (state) Democrats